Gaspare Mainardi (June 1800 in Abbiategrasso, Milan – 9 March 1879 in Lecco) was an Italian mathematician active in differential geometry. He is remembered for the Gauss–Codazzi–Mainardi equations.

References

 Tricomi: La Matematica Italiana 1800-1950 (entry on Mainardi)

19th-century Italian mathematicians
1800 births
1879 deaths